Catherine Sohn is an American businesswoman, pharmacist, and consultant specializing in therapeutic commercialization and licensing.

Education 
Sohn studied biochemistry at the University of California, Davis and later studied clinical pharmacy at the University of California, San Francisco, receiving her Pharm.D. in 1977. She completed a Professional Development certificate at the Wharton School in 2006.

Career 
Sohn spent nearly 30 years working in various roles within GlaxoSmithKline, from 1982 to her retirement in 2010. Her career included stints in medical affairs, strategic product development, product marketing, development of the U.S. Vaccines division, launch of the CNS-active therapeutic Paxil, mergers and acquisitions, and finally a Senior Vice President in the Consumer Health division.

Dr. Sohn serves on the Boards of Directors for Jazz Pharmaceuticals, Rubius Therapeutics, Axcella Health and Landec Corporation. She is an Adjunct Professor in Clinical Pharmacy at UCSF.

Awards 

 2016 - PharmaVoice - "100 Most Inspiring People in the Life Sciences Industry"
 2009 - Frank Barnes Mentor Award, Licensing Executive Society
 2003 - Healthcare Businesswoman's Association "Woman of the Year"
 2000 - UCSF Pharmacy School Distinguished Alumnus of the Year

References 

living people
Year of birth missing (living people)
Women pharmacologists
University of California, Davis alumni